Harry Depue Train II (born November 5, 1927) is a retired United States Navy admiral and a Senior Fellow at the Joint Advanced Warfighting School at the Joint Forces Staff College in Norfolk, Virginia.

Naval career
Train was admitted to the United States Naval Academy in 1945 and graduated in 1949.

Train's operational commands included the attack submarine ; the guided missile destroyer ; Cruiser-Destroyer Flotilla 8; the John F. Kennedy Battle Group; and from August 1976 to September 1978, the United States Sixth Fleet in the Mediterranean Sea.

His principal staff duties included Director of the Joint Staff, Office of the Joint Chiefs of Staff; Executive Assistant to the Chairman, Joint Chiefs of Staff; and Executive Assistant to the Chief of Naval Operations.  He served as aide to Chairman of the Joint Chiefs of Staff Admiral Thomas H. Moorer.

From 1978 to 1982, Train served as the North Atlantic Treaty Organization's Supreme Allied Commander Atlantic as Commander-in-Chief, United States Atlantic Command and as Commander-in-Chief, United States Atlantic Fleet. He retired from the Navy in 1982.

Personal life and post-military service
The son of Rear Admiral Harold Cecil Train (1887–1968) and May Philipps Train (1889–1980), he graduated from the Georgetown Preparatory School in 1945 and the United States Naval Academy in 1949.

Train and his wife, Catharine, have four daughters, including Rear Admiral Elizabeth L. Train.

In 1956, he joined the District of Columbia Society of the Sons of the American Revolution.

After retiring from full-time military service, Train worked for Science Applications International Corporation (SAIC), the nation's largest employee owned research and engineering company. He retired from SAIC as its Manager, Hampton Roads Operations, in September 2006.

Train served as a commissioner on the U.S. Commission on National Security/21st Century. He is a member of the Board of Trustees of the Old Dominion University Research Foundation, and was the long-time president of the Future of Hampton Roads, a group of civic leaders who work toward regional solutions in Hampton Roads, Virginia.

Awards and decorations

See also
List of United States Navy four-star admirals

References

External links
 Profiles at SourceWatch

1927 births
Living people
United States Navy admirals
United States submarine commanders
United States Navy personnel of the Korean War
Recipients of the Defense Distinguished Service Medal
Recipients of the Navy Distinguished Service Medal
Recipients of the Legion of Merit
Georgetown Preparatory School alumni
United States Naval Academy alumni
Naval War College alumni
Military personnel from Norfolk, Virginia